Sir Granville George Greenwood (3 January 1850 – 27 October 1928), usually known as George Greenwood or G. G. Greenwood, was a British lawyer, politician, cricketer, animal welfare reformer and energetic advocate of the Shakespeare authorship question.

Life and work

Born Granville George Greenwood, in Kensington, London, he was the second son of John Greenwood, Q. C. and Fanny Welch. Educated at Eton he was in the "select" for the Newcastle scholarship and then matriculated to Trinity College, Cambridge. As a foundation scholar, he took his degree with a first-class in the classical tripos in 1873. Having been called to the Bar by the Middle Temple in 1876, he joined the Western Circuit. He married in 1878 Laura, daughter of Dr. Cumberbatch and had one son and three daughters.

He contested Peterborough in 1886 and Central Hull in 1900. In 1906 he won Peterborough for the Liberal Party and held it till December 1915, when forced by rheumatism to retire. He was knighted in 1916.

He was an ardent supporter of all measures for the protection of animals, and was on the Council of the Royal Society for the Prevention of Cruelty to Animals, and was President of many similar societies. While he was in Parliament his consistent vigilance and practical knowledge were of great service. He was an outspoken advocate for the independence of India at a time when the Indian cause lacked effective voices within England.

Greenwood was also a cricketer and made a single first-class appearance, for Hampshire against Kent, in one of Hampshire's heaviest first-class defeats. Greenwood scored a single run in each innings of the match. His father John Greenwood and brother, Charles Greenwood, had equally brief first-class careers.

Shakespeare authorship
Greenwood was also one of the most persistent and effective fighters in the Shakespeare authorship question, and published many books on the subject. He was a frequent correspondent to The Times, both on Shakespearean subjects and on the protection of animals.

Greenwood is the author of twelve books and numerous articles on the authorship question, all published 1908–1924. A prolific and entertaining writer, he engaged in a series of well-known public debates, carried on in books and in public forums of exchange such as newspapers and literary journals, with Sir Sidney Lee, the leading Shakespearean biographer of his generation. Although the most effective anti-Stratfordian of the early decades of the 20th century, Greenwood refused to endorse an alternative author of the Shakespearean canon, preferring instead to remain agnostic on the identity of the author while steadfastly maintaining that the traditional view of authorship was ultimately indefensible.

In 1922 he joined with J. Thomas Looney to establish The Shakespeare Fellowship, the organisation which subsequently carried forward public discussion of the authorship question up to the 1940s.

Publications
His major publications include:

 The Faith of an Agnostic (1902)
 The Shakespeare Problem Restated (1908)
 In re Shakespeare: Beeching vs Greenwood (1909)
 The Vindicators of Shakespeare (1911)
 Is There a Shakespeare Problem? (1916)
 Letters to The Nation and the Literary Guide (1915–1916)
 Shakespeare's Law and Latin (1916)
 Shakespeare's Law (1920)
 Shakespeare's Handwriting (1920)
 Ben Jonson and Shakespeare (1921)
 Baconian Essays (Introduction and two essays) (1922)
 Lee, Shakespeare and a Tertium Quid (1923)
 Shakespeare's Signature and "Sir Thomas More" (1924)
 The Stratford Bust and the Droeshout Engraving (1925)

References

Sources
Who was Who OUP, 2007

External links
 
 
 Greenwood biography 
 Granville Greenwood at Cricket Archive
 Works of Greenwood on the Shakespearean Authorship Question
 
 

1850 births
1928 deaths
Animal welfare workers
Alumni of Trinity College, Cambridge
English activists
English cricketers
English environmentalists
English male dramatists and playwrights
English male poets
English non-fiction writers
Knights Bachelor
Literary critics of English
Liberal Party (UK) MPs for English constituencies
Hampshire cricketers
Shakespeare authorship theorists
UK MPs 1906–1910
UK MPs 1910
UK MPs 1910–1918
People educated at Eton College
English barristers